International Student Badminton Tournament (ISBT) is a badminton tournament organised for students, by students. They take place all over Europe, in countries including Austria, England, France, Germany, Ireland, The Netherlands, Norway, Poland, Russia and Scotland. ISBTs promote both the sport of badminton and the social aspect of the game.

ISBTs are open to all standards of player. Many of the student tournaments allow recent graduates to enter under their former clubs or as graduate teams. The players are divided into 4 categories - A (national to top regional standard), B (regional to top club standard), C (club standard) and D (recreational standard). Each player competes in two out of the three disciplines: singles, doubles and mixed doubles. Each match consists of 2 games, so that the result is either a 2-0 win, 0-2 loss or 1-1 draw.

The tournaments are usually 3 to 4 days long and consist of playing badminton during the day and partying at night. Competitors often sleep in the same sports hall where the matches are played and are typically woken up in the morning to the sound of themed music and announcements of the first match of the day. A good example of such a wake up song is "Guten Morgen Sonnenschein" by Nana Mouskouri, however, in the UK and Ireland, accommodation is arranged by the teams themselves. In the event that a player does not turn up for a match, their opponent will receive a walk-over and full points. ISBTs are almost always themed, with a fancy dress party on the last night. Past themes include
 Wild West
 70's
 Seven Deadly Sins & Seven Heavenly Virtues
 3
 Hollywood

The 'Swiss ladder' system is used to rank the players. This means that players compete against others who have had similar results in previous games. A player does not normally play the same opposition twice. After the last round has been played either the player at the top of the table is the named the winner, or there is a play-off between the top two pairs of the division. Players do not enter with a set partner. Each player will be allocated a partner at random from the same section they have entered. This is to even out each section and also highlight the social aspects of these tournaments.

ISBTs have grown rapidly in popularity over the last few years. One of the largest ISBTs on record was the 2008 Irish ISBT that took place in Limerick, Republic of Ireland, at which over 250 players from all over Europe participated.

Team Newcastle (or otherwise known as Newcastle Old Boys) are the most successful franchise in the tournament history. They have won the team trophy, awarded for the best averaged individual player results, 5 times between 2002 and 2015.

International Solibad Badminton Tournament

In June 2013, London hosted the first annual International Solibad Badminton Tournament. The familiar ISBT format is applied, but this tournament is open to all adults, with the student focus being replaced by a charitable focus, raising awareness for the Solibad charity and including fundraising elements.

Upcoming ISBTs
2019
 ISBT Enschede - Enschede, The Netherlands, 29 December 2019 - 1 January 2020, https://rb.gy/fdb5ab

2020
 ISBT Utrecht - Utrecht, The Netherlands, 27 - 29 March 2020, register here

Previous ISBTs

2019
 ISBT Utrecht - Utrecht, The Netherlands, 29 - 31 March 2019

2018
 ISBT Utrecht - Utrecht, The Netherlands, 23 - 25 March 2018
  ISBT Enschede - Enschede, The Netherlands, 29 – 31 December

2017
 ISBT Utrecht - Utrecht, The Netherlands, 24 - 26 March 2017

2016
 ISBT London - London, UK, 25–26 June 2016
 ISBT Utrecht - Utrecht, The Netherlands, 19–20 March 2016

2015
 ISBT Amsterdam - Amsterdam, The Netherlands, 9–10 May 2015
 ISBT Utrecht - Utrecht, The Netherlands, 21–22 March 2015

2014
 ISBT Enschede - Enschede, Netherlands, 28 December - 1 January 2015
 ISBT Limerick - Limerick, Ireland, 25–27 October 2014
 ISBT London - London, UK, 21–22 June 2014
 ISBT Amsterdam - Amsterdam, The Netherlands, 2–4 May 2014
 ISBT Utrecht - Utrecht, The Netherlands, 8–9 March 2014
 TTST 2014 - Rotterdam, The Netherlands, 31 January - 2 February

2013
 ISBT Enschede - Enschede, Netherlands, 29–31 December
 ISBT Ireland - Limerick, Ireland, 26–28 October
 ISBT London (International Solibad Badminton Tournament) - London, England, 29–30 June
 ISBT Maastricht - Maastricht, The Netherlands, 28–30 June
 ISBT Amsterdam - Amsterdam, The Netherlands, 16–19 May
 ISBT Utrecht - Utrecht, The Netherlands, 15–17 March
 Victor TTST Rotterdam - Rotterdam, The Netherlands, 1–3 February

2012
 TTST Rotterdam - Rotterdam, Netherlands, 3–5 February
 ISBT Utrecht - Utrecht, Netherlands, 16–18 March
 The Granite City ISBT - Aberdeen, Scotland, 4–7 April
 ISBT Amsterdam - Amsterdam, Netherlands, 12–13 May
 ISBT Maastricht - Maastricht, Netherlands, 22–24 June
 ISBT Ireland - Limerick, Ireland, 27–29 October
 ISBT Enschede - Enschede, Netherlands, 29–31 December

2011
 ISBT Enschede - Enschede, Netherlands, 28 December – 1 January 2012
 ISBT Ireland - Limerick, Ireland, 29–31 October
 ISBT Tønsberg - Tønsberg, Norway, 10 – 14 August
 ISBT Maastricht - Maastricht, The Netherlands, 24 – 26 June
 ISBT Amsterdam - Amsterdam, The Netherlands, 7 – 8 May
 ISBT Paris - Paris, France, 22 – 24 April
 ISBT Aberdeen - Aberdeen, Scotland, 20 – 23 April
 ISBT Utrecht - Utrecht, The Netherlands, 19 – 20 March
 TTST Rotterdam - Rotterdam, The Netherlands, 5 – 6 February
 ISBT Galway (GSBT) - Galway, Ireland, 21 – 23 January

2010
 ISBT Enschede - Enschede, The Netherlands, 28 – 31 December
 ISBT Pilsen - Plzeň, Czech Republic, 5 – 7 November
 ISBT Ireland - Limerick, Ireland, 22 – 25 October
 ISBT Tilburg - Tilburg, The Netherlands, 16 – 17 October
 ISBT Norway - Tønsberg, Norway, 11 – 15 August
 ISBT Maastricht - Maastricht, The Netherlands, 26 – 27 June
 ISBT Amsterdam - Amsterdam, The Netherlands, 8 – 9 May
 ISBT Poland - Warsaw, Poland, 1 – 2 May
 ISBT Cologne - Köln, Germany, 2 – 5 April
 ISBT Aberdeen - Aberdeen, Scotland, 1 – 3 April
 ISBT Utrecht - Utrecht, The Netherlands, 20 – 21 March
 TTST Rotterdam - Rotterdam, The Netherlands, 6 – 7 February

2009
 ISBT Enschede - Enschede, The Netherlands, 29 – 31 December

2008
 ISBT Berlin - Berlin, Germany, 10 – 12 May
 ISBT Linz - Linz, Austria, 22 – 24 March

References

External links
 ISBT Amsterdam
 ISBT Berlin (last edition in 2008)
 ISBT Cologne (last edition in 2010)
 ISBT Enschede
 ISBT Ireland
 ISBT Linz (last edition in 2008)
 ISBT Maastricht
 ISBT Norway
 ISBT Paris
 ISBT Pilsen
 TTST Rotterdam
 ISBT Tilburg
 ISBT Utrecht
 ISBT Enschede

Badminton tournaments
European international sports competitions
European student competitions
Student sports competitions